The Avenging Shadow is a 1928 American silent action film directed by Ray Taylor and starring Margaret Morris and LeRoy Mason. It was designed as a vehicle for Klondike the Dog, an imitator of Rin Tin Tin.

Cast
 Klondike the Dog as Klondike 
 Ray Hallor as James Hamilton, Young Bank Clerk 
 Wilbur Mack as Worthington, Assistant Cashier 
 Clark Comstock as Sheriff Apling 
 Howard Davies as The Warden 
 Margaret Morris as Marie, The Warden's Daughter 
 LeRoy Mason as George Brooks, Deputy Warden

References

Sources
 Munden, Kenneth White. The American Film Institute Catalog of Motion Pictures Produced in the United States, Part 1. University of California Press, 1997.

External links
 

1928 films
1920s action films
1920s English-language films
American silent feature films
American action films
Films directed by Ray Taylor
American black-and-white films
Pathé Exchange films
Silent action films
1920s American films